Seaborn Wright was a politician in the U.S. state of Georgia. He served in the Georgia House of Representatives from Rome, Georgia. He supported prohibition. He was a third party candidate for governor. He was a strident prohibitionist.

In 1907 he wrote to Thomas Edward Watson.

In 1908 he was billed as a Southern orator and fighter for clean government in a newspaper notice promoting him as a speaker for a campaign rally in Grand Junction, Colorado.

References

People from Rome, Georgia
Members of the Georgia House of Representatives
20th-century American politicians